The 2013 Summit League men's soccer season will be the eighth season of men's varsity soccer in the conference. The venue for the 2013 Summit League Men's Soccer Tournament has yet been announced.

The defending regular season champions are the Oakland Golden Grizzlies, but the school left for the Horizon League at the end of the 2012–13 school year. The Western Illinois Leathernecks are the defending tournament champions.

Changes from 2012 
 As noted above, Oakland departed for the Horizon League.
 The Summit and the Western Athletic Conference effectively swapped members, with Denver moving from the WAC to The Summit and UMKC making the opposite move.

Teams

Stadia and locations 

 North Dakota State, South Dakota and South Dakota State do not sponsor men's soccer

Summit League Tournament 
The format for the 2013 The Summit League Men's Soccer Tournament will be announced in the fall of 2013.

Results

References 

2013 NCAA Division I men's soccer season